Trevor Kent (24 April 1940 – 4 November 1989) was an Australian theatre and television actor who achieved a level of public recognition in the 1980s.

Biography 
Kent initially worked as a primary-school teacher, teaching for three years in Nambour and Buderim in Queensland while acting in amateur theatre groups. Kent moved to Sydney to train as an actor with the Independent Drama School in the early 1960s, supporting himself during this time with teaching. 

In Sydney, he understudied the role of Rolfe in the Tivoli Theatre's production of The Sound of Music, and acted in Becket and Oh Dad, Poor Dad, Mamma's Hung You in the Closet and I'm Feelin' So Sad with the Independent. After two years in Sydney he emigrated to the UK and spent ten years there. In the UK Kent worked with Director Bil Keating and later with the Royal Shakespeare Company. On returning to Sydney in 1974, Kent played Frank'N'Furter in a stage production of The Rocky Horror Show.

Several appearances on Australian television followed, including roles in Rush, The Sullivans, Cop Shop and Carson's Law. He moved to Melbourne in 1984 and in 1984–1985 appeared in television soap opera Prisoner as the villainous Frank Burke for several months.

Kent, who was gay, learned he was HIV positive in the mid 1980s and at that time volunteered as a care-taker for people living with HIV and AIDS. He was public about his HIV status and directed two theatre productions for Out Theatre Company that addressed HIV and AIDS. One of these, Unnatural Acts, toured pubs, theatres and colleges in Melbourne and Sydney.

Death 
Kent continued to work with the theatre group until a few weeks before his death in 1989. His final acting appearance was a scene with Meryl Streep in the film A Cry in the Dark (1988).

Filmography

References

External links
 

Australian male film actors
Australian male musical theatre actors
Australian male soap opera actors
1940 births
1989 deaths
Australian gay actors
AIDS-related deaths in Australia
Infectious disease deaths in Victoria (Australia)
20th-century Australian male actors
20th-century Australian male singers
20th-century Australian LGBT people